WFMI (100.9 FM, "Rejoice! 100.9") is a radio station broadcasting an Urban Gospel format from the Rejoice! Musical Soul Food satellite feed. Licensed to Southern Shores, North Carolina, United States, it serves Northeast North Carolina along with the Hampton Roads, Virginia area. The station is currently owned by Communications Systems, Inc.

External links
WFMI official website

FMI
Gospel radio stations in the United States
Radio stations established in 2003